Jean François de Bette, 3rd Marquess of Lede (6 December 1672 – Madrid, 11 January 1725) was a Belgian military commander in Spanish service. He was also lord of the Fiefdom of Lede in Flanders.

Biography
Born in Brussels, son of Ambroise de Bette, 2nd Marquess of Lede and Dorotea, lady of Croÿ. His grandfather was Guillaume de Bette, 1st Marquess of Lede. He served the Spanish Crown for most of his life, including as Commander-General of Aragon and Majorca.  On 31 March  1703, he became a Knight of the Golden Fleece.

He is best known for his part in the War of the Quadruple Alliance, when he commanded the Spanish troops who tried to conquer Sardinia and Sicily back from the Austrians in 1718–1719. He was victorious in the Battle of Milazzo (1718) and Battle of Francavilla (1719).  The Quadruple Alliance was constituted on 2 August 1718 by Austria, Great Britain, France, and Savoy against the itching wishes of the Spaniards on controlling again the Kingdoms of Sardinia, Sicily, and Naples as they had in the last three centuries before the Treaties of Utrecht and Rastatt.

He was also Viceroy of Sicily during this short occupation of the island.

In 1720–1721, he led a successful expedition to lift the Siege of Ceuta by Sultan Moulay Ismail.  He was awarded the title of Grandee of Spain by King Philip V of Spain in 1721. He was also president of the Spanish War Council, 1724.  He died at Madrid in 1725.

His only son Emannuel de Bette, 4th Marquess of Lede was the last Marquess of Lede, he died without issue.

Ancestors

References

External links
Belgian Nobility
Family tree

1672 births
1725 deaths
Nobility of the Austrian Netherlands
Grandees of Spain
Viceroys of Sicily
Spanish generals
Spanish diplomats
Knights of the Golden Fleece of Spain
Spanish people of Flemish descent
Military personnel of the Austrian Netherlands